A Night at Boomers, Vol. 1 (reissued on CD as Naima) is a live album by pianist Cedar Walton recorded in 1973 and released on the Muse label.

Reception
Allmusic awarded the album 4½ stars.

Track listing 
All compositions by Cedar Walton except as indicated
 "Holy Land" - 6:51   
 "This Guy's in Love with You" (Burt Bacharach, Hal David) - 8:11   
 "Cheryl" (Charlie Parker) - 8:41   
 "The Highest Mountain" - 6:22   
 "Down in Brazil" (Roy Burrowes, Beaver Harris) - 6:03   
 "St. Thomas" (Sonny Rollins) - 10:14   
 "Bleecker Street Theme" - 1:03

Personnel 
Cedar Walton - piano 
Clifford Jordan - tenor saxophone (tracks 1 & 3-7)
Sam Jones - bass
Louis Hayes - drums

References 

Cedar Walton live albums
1973 live albums
Muse Records live albums
Albums produced by Don Schlitten